is a Japanese manga artist. After graduating from Shizuoka Prefectural Shimada Commercial High School he moved to Tokyo and in 1968 took a job with Saito Productions, the company run by Takao Saitō. In 1971 he worked with Kazuo Koike at Studio Ship.

Koyama debuted in Shōnen Sunday in 1973 with Ore wa Chokkaku. He has won multiple awards in the manga field, winning the Shogakukan Manga Award twice, once in 1977 for Ganbare Genki and again in 1998 for Azumi. Azumi also won an Excellence Award at the 1997 Japan Media Arts Festival.

Works

References

 Gifford, Kevin. "Azumi". (November 2006) Newtype USA. p. 154.

External links
 Yū Koyama's Official Website
 Profile  at The Ultimate Manga Page
 

 
1948 births
Living people
Manga artists from Shizuoka Prefecture